A primary group may refer to:
 In mathematics, a special kind of group:
 a p-primary group, also called simply p-group; or
 a primary cyclic group, which is a p-primary cyclic group.
 In sociology, a primary group as opposed to secondary group.